The 1942–43 season was the 16th season of competitive football in the British Mandate for Palestine under the Eretz Israel Football Association.

IFA Competitions

1941–42 Palestine League

League matches, which started during the previous season were continued during the season. The Jerusalem division was completed during the season, while the Southern division had one match, between Maccabi Tel Aviv and Maccabi Nes Tziona, left to complete. This match was played on 4 September 1943.

Southern division table

Jerusalem division table (top 3)

1943 Palestine Cup

A cup competition was held during spring 1943, which was called The Wartime Cup. Early round matches were regionalized, with the four divisional winners meeting in the semi-finals. The early rounds of the competition were played during the season, with the semi-finals and final being delayed to the start of the next season.

Notable events
Osud Al-Shahba (Aleppo Lions) visited Tel Aviv on 31 October 1942, playing a single match against Maccabi Tel Aviv, winning 6–2.
Corinthians, a team composed of British professional players stationed in the Middle East played several matches in Palestine in December 1942 and Between 27 February and 4 April 1943, playing against British, Jewish and Arab teams. In December, the team had beaten a British Police XI 3–2 and a Maccabi XI 2–1. In the team's second visit, the team had played twice against Hapoel XI, winning 6–2 and 3–2, twice against YMCA Jerusalem, winning 4–3 and 4–2, and once against a Jewish Settlement Police XI, winning 7–3. Corinthians also played a match in Jerusalem against Wanderers, another team composed of British professional players, losing 0–3.
Wanderers, which visited Palestine during the previous season, played three matches during March 1943. The team, with players such as Tom Cooper, Albert Cox and Tom Finney, won 8–0 against an RAF XI, and drew 0 – 0 against Maccabi XI, before continuing their tour to Lebanon and Syria. During the team's return trip towards their base in Egypt, the team played a match against Corinthians, winning 3–0.
In late May 1943, a Maccabi team travelled to Beirut and played two matches, winning 2–1 against Lebanese champions Al Nahda FC and 3–2 against a Beirut XI, a team composed of footballers from Al Nahda, Homenetmen and Racing Beirut.
An Egyptian Army XI, a team composed of players from Al Ahly, Farouk Club and Arsenal Cairo, visited Palestine during June 1943, playing four matches. In their first match, the Egyptians had beaten Maccabi Tel Aviv 2–0, and repeated the result in their second match, against Hapoel Tel Aviv. A third match was played at Rehovot, against a team composed of the best players from Maccabi Rishon LeZion, Maccabi Rehovot and Maccabi Nes Tziona, which the Egyptians won 4–2. The final match of the team was played against an EIFA XI (essentially, the national team), and was won by the Egyptians 3–1.
On 26 June 1943, Hapoel Haifa had won the Haifa Cup, beating a British Military team 5–3 on aggregate.

References